Murray Hill, New York may refer to:
Murray Hill (New York) in Herkimer County
Murray Hill, Manhattan
Murray Hill, Queens